The Brecker Bros. Collection, Vol 2 is a compilation album by the American jazz fusion group, the Brecker Brothers. It was released by Novus Records in 1991. This compilation followed the release of The Brecker Bros. Collection, Vol 1, in 1990.

Reception 
AllMusic awarded the album with 4.5 out of 5 stars. The Penguin Guide review says: "Aside from their individual exploits, the two Brecker Brothers made some commercially successful records as co-leaders in the mid-1970s, and these two best-ofs give a clear picture of what they did: jazz-funk rhythms streamlined with guitars and keyboards, sometimes as settings for grandstand solos by either of the two principles but equally often as grooving ensemble pieces".

Track listing 
 "Rocks" (Randy Brecker) — 4:39
 "A Creature of Many Faces" (Randy Brecker) — 7:42
 "Funky Sea, Funky Dew (live version)" (Michael Brecker) — 8:00
 "Skunk Funk (live version)" (Randy Brecker) — 6:55
 "Sponge (live version)" (Randy Brecker) — 6:19
 "Squids (live version)" (Randy Brecker) — 7:54
 "Tee’d Off" (Michael Brecker) — 3:43
 "Squish" (Randy Brecker) — 5:50
 "Baffled" (Randy Brecker) — 5:20
 "Not Ethiopia" (Michael Brecker) — 5:41
 "Jacknife" (Randy Brecker) — 6:18

Personnel 
 Randy Brecker – trumpet, flugelhorn
 Michael Brecker – tenor saxophone
David Sanborn – alto saxophone
Don Grolnick – keyboards
Bob Mann – guitar
Will Lee – bass
Harvey Mason – drums
Ralph MacDonald – percussion
Barry Finnerty – guitar
Neil Jason – bass, lead vocal
Terry Bozzio – drums
Sammy Figueroa – percussion
Rafael Cruz – percussion
Mark Gray – electric piano
George Duke – string synthesizer
Hiram Bullock – guitar
Steve Jordan – drums
Airto Moreira – percussion
Marcus Miller – bass
Richie Morales – drums
Don Alias – percussion

References 

1991 compilation albums
Brecker Brothers albums
Albums produced by Michael Cuscuna